Liu Minghui (1914–2010) was a People's Republic of China politician born in Shicheng County, Jiangxi Province. He was governor of Yunnan Province and police chief of Chongqing. He was a delegate to the 3rd National People's Congress.

1914 births
2010 deaths
People's Republic of China politicians from Jiangxi
Chinese Communist Party politicians from Jiangxi
Governors of Yunnan
Delegates to the 3rd National People's Congress
Chinese police officers
Politicians from Ganzhou